Kinniya is a town located east coast in Trincomalee District of the Eastern Province of Sri Lanka. Located in Sri Lanka's dry zone, the Kinniya region often experiences hot and dry weather with very little precipitation. Kinniya Bridge is the Sri Lanka's longest bridge situated in kinniya, which attracts many tourists in the town. Being located on the Trincomalee Harbour, Kinniya was badly devastated by the massive tsunami that resulted from the 2004 Indian Ocean earthquake.

History

Kinniya has over 500 years of history. A 400-year-old Grand masjid in Kinniya was reconstructed in 2002 by the Saudi Arabian government. Most of the inhabitants from Kinniya are immigrants from Morocco, Java, Pakistan and Afghanistan. Its name "Kinniya" defines the kinni tree which was the identity of the people of Kinniya once upon a time.

Demographics

Kinniya is a Moorish majority town. The moors are all predominantly, Muslims, there are also small communities belonging to other ethnic groups such as Sri Lankan Tamils and Sinhalese. 

Ethnicity identification in Kinniya Urban Council area. 

Source:statistics.gov.lk. 

 Religious Identification in Kinniya Urban Council area.

Source:-Statistics.gov.lk.

Economy

The fisheries sector plays a key role in social and economic life of Kinniya.

Education

Kinniya has well educated structures from all streams such as, Medicine, Law, Engineering, Government Jobs and Academic staffs. Many government and private schools and colleges has been established in the town,  Higher education centers also situated for the education purposes, few years back due to the Sri Lankan Civil War it had been suffer education as unable to go to any places for higher studies.

 T/Kinniya Al Aqsa National School 
 Kinniya Central College.
 Kinniya Muslim Girls Maha Vid (National School). 
 Aligar Maha Vidyalayam.
 TB Jaya Vidyalaya
 Abdul Majeed Vidyalaya

See also
Kinniya Urban Council
Nilaveli
Thiriyai

References

External links
 kinniya.net (In Tamil)

Towns in Trincomalee District
Kinniya DS Division